Pseudoclavibacter helvolus is a bacterium from the genus Pseudoclavibacter which has been first isolated from butter.

References

Microbacteriaceae
Bacteria described in 2004